Binnie is both a surname and a given name. Notable people with the name include:


Surname
Alex Binnie (footballer), Scottish footballer of the 1920s
Alex Binnie (tattoo artist) (born 1959), English tattooist and printmaker
Alexander Binnie (1839–1917), civil engineer who worked on crossings of the River Thames in London
Brian Binnie (born 1953), test pilot for the experimental spaceplane SpaceShipOne
Brian Binnie (born 1968), Scottish curler
Christopher Binnie, Jamaican squash player
Edward Binnie (1884–1956), Antarctic administrator
Geoffrey Binnie (1908–1989), British civil engineer
Ian Binnie (born 1939), puisne justice on the Supreme Court of Canada
William Binnie (minister) (1823–1886) Scottish Presbyterian minister who wrote on the Psalms
William Binnie (architect) (c. 1885/1886 – ?), Scottish architect
William Binnie (engineer) (1867–1949), British civil engineer
William Harrison Binnie (born 1958), industrialist in New Hampshire, USA

Given name or nickname
Gertrude Binnie Barnes (1903–1998), English actress
Beatrice Binnie Hale (1899–1984), English actress and musician
Binnie Kirshenbaum (born 1964), American writer of novels and short stories
Binnie (born 1997), South Korean member of girl group Oh My Girl

Fictional characters
Binnie Roberts, in the BBC soap opera EastEnders

See also
Binny, a surname
Binay, a surname